The seventh government of Israel was formed by David Ben-Gurion on 3 November 1955 following the July 1955 elections. His coalition included Mapai, the National Religious Front, Mapam, Ahdut HaAvoda, and the Israeli Arab parties, the Democratic List for Israeli Arabs, Progress and Work and Agriculture and Development.

On 17 December 1957 Ben-Gurion accused Ahdut HaAvoda ministers of leaking information about IDF Chief of Staff Moshe Dayan's trip to West Germany to the press and demanded their resignation. The government fell after Ben-Gurion resigned on 31 December 1957 over the issue, but remained in place until Ben-Gurion formed the eighth government a week later.

1 Sapir was elected to the next Knesset as an MK for Mapai.

2 Carmel later joined the third Knesset as an MK for Ahdut HaAvoda.

References

External links
Third Knesset: Government 7 Knesset website

 07
1955 establishments in Israel
1957 disestablishments in Israel
Cabinets established in 1955
Cabinets disestablished in 1957
1955 in Israeli politics
1956 in Israeli politics
1957 in Israeli politics
1958 in Israeli politics
 07